A Markman hearing is a pretrial hearing in a U.S. District Court during which a judge examines evidence from all parties on the appropriate meanings of relevant key words used in a patent claim, when patent infringement is alleged by a plaintiff. It is also known as a "Claim Construction Hearing".

Holding a Markman hearing in patent infringement cases has been common practice since the U.S. Supreme Court, in the 1996 case of Markman v. Westview Instruments, Inc., found that the language of a patent is a matter of law for a judge to decide, not a matter of fact for a jury to decide. In the United States, juries determine facts in many situations, but judges determine matters of law.

Markman hearings are important, because the court determines patent infringement cases by the interpretation of claims. A Markman hearing may encourage settlement, because the judge's claim construction finding can indicate a likely outcome for the patent infringement case as a whole. Markman hearings are before a judge, and generally take place before trial. A Markman hearing may occur before the close of discovery, along with a motion for preliminary injunction, or at the end of discovery, in relation to a motion for summary judgment. A Markman hearing may also be held after the trial begins, but before jury selection.

The evidence considered in a Markman hearing falls into two categories: intrinsic and extrinsic. Intrinsic evidence consists of the patent documentation and any prosecution history of the patent. Extrinsic evidence is testimony, expert opinion, or other unwritten sources; extrinsic evidence may not contradict intrinsic evidence.

References 

United States patent law